Oligoxyloglucan reducing-end-specific cellobiohydrolase is an enzyme with systematic name oligoxyloglucan reducing-end cellobiohydrolase. This enzyme catalyses the following chemical reaction

 Hydrolysis of cellobiose from the reducing end of xyloglucans consisting of a (1->4)-beta-linked glucan carrying alpha-D-xylosyl groups on O-6 of the glucose residues.

The enzyme is found in the fungus Geotrichum sp. M128.

References

External links 
 

EC 3.2.1